Jehan A. Gordon-Booth (born 1981) is a Democratic member of the Illinois House of Representatives, representing  the 92nd district since 2009.

Gordon-Booth was born and raised in Peoria County, Illinois, where she attended Limestone High School in Bartonville, and attended Parkland College and the University of Illinois at Urbana-Champaign.

Gordon-Booth was on the Pleasant Hill School District 69 Board of Education before her election to the Illinois House.

Gordon-Booth was elected in November 2008 to the seat being vacated by Aaron Schock. She defeated Joan Krupa, but Krupa was appointed to the seat to fill the remaining nine days of Schock's term when Schock became U.S. Representative for Illinois's 18th congressional district.

In 2018, J. B. Pritzker appointed Gordon-Booth to the gubernatorial transition's Restorative Justice and Safe Communities Committee.

As of July 3rd, 2022, Representative Gordon-Booth was a member of the following committees:

 Appropriations - Human Services Committee (HAPH)
 Appropriations - Public Safety Committee (HAPP)
 Executive Committee (HEXC)
 Redistricting Committee (HRED)
 Restorative Justice Committee (SHRJ)
 Rules Committee (HRUL)
 Special Issues (AP) Subcommittee (HAPH-ISSU)

References

External links
Representative Jehan A. Gordon-Booth (D) 92nd District at the Illinois General Assembly
By session: 98th, 97th, 96th
Representative Jehan Gordon-Booth
 

1981 births
21st-century American politicians
21st-century American women politicians
African-American state legislators in Illinois
African-American women in politics
Democratic Party members of the Illinois House of Representatives
Living people
Politicians from Peoria, Illinois
Women state legislators in Illinois